This is a list of major companies and organizations in Greater Cincinnati, through corporate or subsidiary headquarters or through significant operational and employment presence near Cincinnati, Ohio, USA.

Altogether, six Fortune 500 companies and seven Fortune 1000 companies have headquarters in the Cincinnati area.

Automobiles

Headquarters
Mitsubishi Automotive Electric America (in Mason, Ohio)
Toyota Boshoku America, manufactures seats, power train parts and other components for automakers Toyota Motor Corp., General Motors and others (in Erlanger, Kentucky)

Significant operations
Ford Motor Company, operates the Sharonville Transmission plant, which employs 1,400 people.

Banking and financial services

Headquarters
Cincinnati Financial (Nasdaq: CINF), the 20th largest insurance company by market share in the U.S. (in Fairfield, OH)
Fifth Third Bank (Nasdaq: FITB), 25th largest bank in the United States; employs 7,645. $13.5 BN local deposits
First Financial Bank (Nasdaq: FFBC), a regional bank headquartered in Cincinnati; has client servicing operations in the Tri-County, northern Cincinnati metropolitan area; founded in 1863, it has the eighth oldest national bank charter and has locations in Southwest Ohio, Northern Kentucky, and throughout Indiana; acquired Irwin Financial Corp and its subsidiaries through a government-assisted transaction on September 18, 2009

Significant operations
Citigroup, Call Center and Information Technology and Consumer Innovation Training Center employs more than 3,000 in Boone County, KY.
Fidelity Investments, mutual fund and financial services company. Midwest Region Center employs 3,600 people (in Covington, KY)
 Huntington Bancshares, third largest bank in Ohio
PNC Bank, third largest bank in the Cincinnati area; $5.1 BN total local deposits ($2.7 BN - PNC, $2.4 BN - National City subsidiary)
US Bank, second largest bank in the Cincinnati area; $9 BN local deposits

Chemicals

Headquarters
Ashland Global Specialty Chemicals Inc. (NYSE: ASH),  a global chemicals company (in Covington, Kentucky); Formerly the parent company of Valvoline Inc.

Significant operations
LyondellBasell, a multinational chemicals company; the Cincinnati Technology Center houses the research and development functions for LyondellBasell's Equistar polymers business
Rohm and Haas, one of the world's largest manufacturers of specialty chemicals; Cincinnati facility produces specialty chemicals used to manufacture vinyl siding and windows, PVC pipe and fittings, plastic bottles and blister packaging; recently acquired by Dow Chemical Co.

Commercial services

Headquarters
Belcan, a global supplier of engineering, supply chain, technical recruiting and information technology (IT) services to customers in the aerospace, defense, automotive, industrial and government sectors.
Champlin Architecture, architectural firm specializing in healthcare, corporate, higher education, religious and civic projects
Cintas (Nasdaq: CTAS), uniform supplier in Mason, Ohio
Synnex formerly Convergys, customer care, human resources and billing service provider. Now known as TD Synnex, and headquartered in Fremont, California.
Empower MediaMarketing, advertising agency that communicates to and with consumers through an integrated combination of media
Omnicare (NYSE: OCR), provider of pharmaceuticals, related consulting and data management services
Rumpke, one of the largest privately owned residential and commercial waste and recycling firms in the U.S.

Significant operations
Duke Energy, provider of gas and electricity services in the Midwest and Carolina regions; acquired Cincinnati-based Cinergy in 2005
Tata Consultancy Services, regional office of India-based IT services, consulting and outsourcing firm in Milford, Ohio

Construction and real estate

Headquarters
General Cable (NYSE: BGC), manufacturer of copper, aluminum and fiber optic wire and cable products, located in Highland Heights, Kentucky

Significant operations
Turner Construction, largest US construction company, Cincinnati business office
Al. Neyer, real estate development and design-build construction company, Cincinnati business office

Food and beverage

Headquarters
Givaudan, US headquarters and production site for this flavor and sensory company
Grippo's, snack food company
Perfetti Van Melle, marketer and manufacturer of candy including the brands Airheads and Mentos; U.S. headquarters located in Erlanger, Kentucky
Skyline Chili, cheese coney restaurant 
Gold Star Chili, cheese coney restaurant
Larosa's, regional pizza chain

Significant operations
Boston Beer Company, operates a brewery for Sam Adams Beer; produces about 20% of the total production of Sam Adams
The J.M. Smucker Co., operates a Crisco production site and maintains Folgers Coffee administrative functions locally
Kellogg's, operates a Keebler's cookie & cracker manufacturing plant in Fairfax, Ohio
Archer Daniels Midland, parent company of Wild Flavors, operates its Global Technology and Digital Innovation headquarters in Erlanger, KY

Government, education, and non-profit

Headquarters
Archdiocese of Cincinnati, Roman Catholic diocese, includes parishes, schools, charitable organizations; employs 6,152
Cincinnati Children's, provider of pediatric health care, research and education; employs 15,260
Cincinnati Public Schools, school system; employs 5,055
City of Cincinnati, city administration; employs 5,441
Episcopal Diocese of Southern Ohio, Episcopal Church diocese, includes parishes, schools, covenants, community organizations
Great Lakes and Ohio River Division, U.S. Army Corps of Engineers, operates as a regional business center with seven districts that covers 335,000 sq. mi. in 17 states, utilizing about 5,000 team members
Hamilton County, county administration; employs 6,304
Matthew 25: Ministries, humanitarian aid organization
Mercy Health Partners, not-for-profit, integrated network of medical services and facilities; employs 6,948
Miami University, public university of 16,000 students; employs 4,399
University of Cincinnati, public research university of over 41,000 students, founded in 1819; employs 15,862
Xavier University, founded in 1831, fourth-oldest Jesuit university in the United States; Over 6,500 students; employs 667.

Significant operations
United States Postal Service, employs 6,379

Health and biotechnology

Headquarters
CareStar, home health care company specializing in case management for consumers and providers of home and community-based services
Chemed (NYSE: CHE), parent of Roto-Rooter, the largest plumbing and drain-cleaning company in North America
Ethicon Endo-Surgery, surgical instruments for minimally invasive surgery and surgical procedures; a subsidiary of Johnson & Johnson (in Blue Ash, Ohio)
LCA-Vision (Nasdaq: LCAV), provides laser vision correction services under the LasikPlus brand
Medpace (Nasdaq: MEDP), a contract research organization (CRO), bioanalytical laboratory, central laboratory, and clinical pharmacology unit
Prasco Laboratories, pharmaceutical company specializing in manufacturing authorized generic products under private labels

Significant operations
Amylin Pharmaceuticals, established a $70 million biomedical manufacturing facility in West Chester, Ohio to manufacture a long-acting release formulation of  exenatide, a compound in development for type two  diabetes
Humana, health insurance provider; Cincinnati Service Center employs 1,000
Patheon, provider of contract dosage form development and manufacturing services to the pharmaceutical and biotechnology industries (in Reading, Ohio)
Anthem, Inc., the United States' largest health insurer by total subscribers and a Fortune top 50 company (in Mason, Ohio)
Spear-Mulqueeny Funeral Homes, Funeral and Cremation provider in Painesville and Fairport Harbor, Ohio. They have been vital, caregiving members of the Lake County community for 100 years. They are committed to assist in the grieving process by offering quality service in a timely, compassionate and cost-effective manner for the Ohio families.

Consumer goods

Headquarters
Kao Brands, US subsidiary headquarters of Kao Corporation which manufactures products under the name Jergens
Luxottica Retail, a division of Luxottica SpA of Milan, Italy (in Mason, Ohio); manages the Lenscrafters, Pearle Vision, Sunglass Hut, and Watch Station brands
Procter & Gamble, (NYSE: PG), the world's largest consumer products company; largest brands include Always, Ariel, Bounty, Bounce, Braun, Crest, Dawn, Downy, Fusion, Gain, Gillette, Head & Shoulders, Ivory, Olay, Oral B, Pampers, Pantene, Puffs, Secret, Tide, Vicks, & Whisper
Totes, marketer of umbrellas, gloves, raincoats, rubber overshoes, and other weather-related accessories
United States Playing Card Company, world's largest and most renowned playing card company (in Erlanger, Kentucky)
The Gorilla Glue Company, a brand of polyurethane adhesives based in Sharonville, Ohio

Industrial goods and services

Headquarters
AK Steel, steel producer (in West Chester, Ohio); acquired by Cleveland-Cliffs in 2020.
CFM International, manufacturer of jet engines; joint venture between Snecma (SAFRAN Group) and the General Electric Company 
Formica Corporation, surface material manufacturer, subsidiary of New Zealand-based Fletcher Building
Fujitec America, elevator manufacturing (in Mason, Ohio)
GE Aviation, aircraft engine manufacturer;a subsidiary of the General Electric conglomerate (in Evendale, Ohio); employs 7,400
GE Honda Aero Engines, engine designer and manufacturer for business aviation;  50% owned by GE, 50% owned by Honda
Hillman Group, Founded in 1964 and headquartered in Cincinnati, Ohio, Hillman is a leading North American provider of complete hardware solutions.
Makino, producer of machine tools and precision metal-cutting production machinery, including horizontal machining centers, vertical machining centers, graphite machining centers, and wire and Ram EDM
Milacron (NYSE: MZ), a plastics machinery producer, formerly Cincinnati Milling Machine Company
Omya, North America headquarters of the Switzerland-based international white minerals company supplying calcium carbonate and talc
Total Quality Logistics, a third-party logistics provider (in Milford, Ohio)

Significant Operations
General Electric Global Operations, GE's multi-functional shared service organization. Located at the Banks in Downtown Cincinnati & Projected to employ 1,800 by the end of 2017.

Insurance

Headquarters
American Financial Group (NYSE: AFG), insurance and investment holding company; parent of Great American Insurance Co.
Cincinnati Financial Corporation (Nasdaq: CINF), holding company with subsidiaries which underwrite fire, automobile, casualty and other related forms of insurance
Ohio National Life Insurance Company, personal and business insurance sales and services
Western & Southern Financial Group, the flagship sponsor of the Cincinnati Masters tennis tournament, which is part of the ATP Tour

Law

Headquarters
Dinsmore & Shohl, LLP, largest law firm in Cincinnati with 625 attorneys in 21 cities throughout California, Colorado, Connecticut, Illinois, Kentucky, Michigan, Ohio, Pennsylvania, Washington D.C., and West Virginia.
Frost Brown Todd LLC, midwestern firm with offices in Ohio, Kentucky, Tennessee, Indiana, and West Virginia.
Taft Stettinius & Hollister LLP, large corporate law firm with office in Ohio, Kentucky, and Arizona. Founded in 1885 by the sons of President William Howard Taft.

Media

Headquarters

E.W. Scripps Company (NYSE: SSP), a media company that owns many newspapers, cable channels and news stations; hosts the National Spelling Bee

Townsquare Media, privately held radio broadcaster which owns approximately 70 stations in small and medium markets in the United States

Retail

Headquarters
Cornerstone Brands, owner of catalog brands including Frontgate and Smith&Noble (in West Chester, Ohio); subsidiary of HSN Inc.
KOI Auto Parts,  chain of auto parts stores
Kroger (NYSE: KR), the largest company of supermarket chains in the United States (Fortune 500 #26);chains include Food 4 Less, Fred Meyer, Fry's, Kroger, Ralph's, Smith's Food and Drug, Dillons, Bakers, Gerbes, QFC, Lucky's and Turkey Hill
United Dairy Farmers, regionally based convenience store and ice cream maker

Significant operations
Wal-Mart Stores, international discount retailer; employs 7,500

Technology and telecom

Headquarters
Cincinnati Bell (NYSE: CBB), provides voice and data telecommunications products and services
Cincom, privately held, multinational, computer technology corporation founded in 1968; manufactures enterprise software, and provides information technology (IT) hosting services
dotloop, SaaS real estate technology subsidiary of Zillow.com
General Cable (NYSE: BGC), global wire & cable manufacturer (in Highland Heights, KY), incorporated in 1927. Fortune 500 #443
MeasureNet Technology Ltd., private LLP manufacturer of network-based electronic data acquisition interfaces for science teaching laboratories
WhatIfSports.com, specializes in online sports simulations and fantasy-style games
Cadre Information Security, cybersecurity consulting company
4BIS - IT support company focusing on Cyber Security for the small to medium sized business.

Significant operations
Siemens, facility in Norwood is dedicated to developing, assembling, and testing large electric motors that are used in industrial and factory automation

Transportation

Headquarters
Delta Private Jets (originally Comair Jet Express), a charter service offered by Delta Airlines that provides on-demand service to domestic and international destinations
First Group America, school bus operator and Greyhound; subsidiary of United Kingdom-based First Group PLC
Southern Air, a cargo carrier for DHL Aviation, which has its main hub at Cincinnati/Northern Kentucky International Airport
Total Quality Logistics, North America's second largest freight brokerage firm
Ultimate Air Shuttle, a charter airline providing daily service to numerous destinations across the United States

Significant operations
Allegiant Air, an ultra-low-cost airline that has its largest, non-vacation destination focus city at Cincinnati/Northern Kentucky International Airport.
Amazon.com announced that Amazon Air's worldwide cargo distribution hub will be established at Cincinnati/Northern Kentucky International Airport.
CSX, international transportation company, operates CSX Queensgate Yard, one of the largest 10 of CSX classification yards.
DHL Express, provider of air express transportation operates a hub at Cincinnati/Northern Kentucky International Airport.

Travel, leisure, and dining

Headquarters
Columbia Sussex, hotel and casino operator (in Crestview Hills, Kentucky)
Frisch's Restaurants, Inc. (Nasdaq: FRS), owner of Frisch's Big Boy chain and Midwest operator of select Golden Corral restaurants; employs 4,500
Gold Star Chili, Cincinnati style chili chain
Graeters, ice cream, bakery, and candy shops;  the New York Times has called it "the ice cream most connoisseurs feel to be the best in the world"
LaRosa's Pizza, regional pizza chain
Penn Station East Coast Subs, regional sandwich chain
Skyline Chili, Cincinnati style chili chain
Winegardner and Hammons, full-service hotel management and development company established in 1961;  one of the original franchisers of Holiday Inn

Significant operations
Cedar Fair, one of the largest regional amusement-resort operators in the world; operates Kings Island theme park (in Mason, Ohio)

See also

List of companies of the United States by state

References

Cincinnati
Indiana-related lists
Cincinnati
Companies